In Deep Sleep is a 2020 Russian drama film directed by Mariya Ignatenko. The film is a participant of Kinotavr-2020 and the Forum program of the Berlin International Film Festival.

Plot 
Victor's wife suddenly dies, causing his world to fall into a deep sleep and Victor decides to look for a man who does not sleep.

Cast

References

External links 
 

2020 films
2020s Russian-language films
2020 drama films
Russian drama films